The 1st Mounted Rifles (Canterbury Yeomanry Cavalry) were a mounted rifles regiment raised just before World War I, raised and based in the region of Canterbury. It can trace its history back to 1864 with the formation of the Canterbury Yeomanry Cavalry.

History

Origins and formation 
The Canterbury Yeomanry Cavalry was established as a volunteer corps at Christchurch in 1864. It was the oldest of twelve light cavalry units raised in New Zealand during the second half of the nineteenth century, using the British Yeomanry regiments as a model.

While numbering less than 100 men, scattered in small detachments across Canterbury Province, the unit earned a reputation for well drilled smartness and provided honour guards and ceremonial escorts as required. It was brought together for a training camp of eight days each year. A scarlet and blue uniform was worn with black facings and a red plumed helmet.

With the introduction of a conscription-based territorial system in 1911-12, the Canterbury Yeomanry Cavalry became "A" Squadron of the 1st Mounted Rifles (Canterbury Yeomanry Cavalry). Following this, the regiment was formed on 17 March 1911.

World War I
They were mobilised during World War I as a squadron of the Canterbury Mounted Rifles Regiment. They served in the Middle Eastern theatre of World War I and first saw action during the Battle of Gallipoli.

As a part of the larger New Zealand Mounted Rifles Brigade (of the ANZAC Mounted Division) they went on to serve in the Sinai and Palestine Campaign.

The battle they participated in were
Battle of Gallipoli
Battle of Romani
Battle of Magdhaba
Battle of Rafa
First Battle of Gaza
Second Battle of Gaza
Third Battle of Gaza
Battle of Beersheba
Battle of Megiddo (1918)

Between the wars
In 1921 they were amalgamated with the 8th (South Canterbury) Mounted Rifles and redesignated the Canterbury Yeomanry Cavalry. By 1942, the regiment, as 1st Light Armoured Fighting Vehicles Regiment (Canterbury Yeomanry Cavalry), was part of the 5th Division's divisional troops, located at Ashburton.

They were absorbed into the 3rd Armoured Regiment on  29 March 1944.

Alliances
 – 12th Royal Lancers

References

Cavalry regiments of New Zealand
Military units and formations established in 1911
Military units and formations disestablished in 1944
Cavalry regiments of New Zealand in World War I
History of Canterbury, New Zealand
1911 establishments in New Zealand